Andiamo (foaled 3 August 1993) is an influential Dutch Warmblood stallion. He had high placings himself in numerous Nations Cups, World Cups and Grand Prix, and under different riders (including Henk van de Broek, Jos Lansink, Jean-Claude Van Geenberghe, and Kristoph Cleeren).

References

Dutch show jumping horses
Individual warmbloods
Sport horse sires
1993 animal births